Critical Role episodes split by campaign and then by year, as well as one-shot episodes.

Series overview 
In June 2021, the cast of Critical Role finished their second Dungeons & Dragons campaign. The third campaign premiered on October 21, 2021.

Campaigns

Campaign one (2015–2017)

The Vox Machina campaign originated as the home game of the cast, played from 2012 to 2017; the show begins in media res with the characters regrouping in the city of Emon after approximately 6 months apart and the streamed campaign picks up where the cast's original home game left off. While the adventures prior to the Kraghammer arc (2015) were not formally recorded, some shorter recordings have been released by the cast. This includes audio from the first session of the campaign, which was released as a segment in the third episode of the podcast All Work No Play. Additionally, Liam O'Brien released a recording of the magic carpet being discovered by the party.  Episode 36  features a summary of the pre-series history, with artwork created by Wendy Sullivan Green and voice-overs provided by the cast. The comic book, Critical Role: Vox Machina Origins, is an adaptation of the group's game before the show. The animated series, The Legend of Vox Machina, also adapts a canonic story that took place within the pre-stream time frame.

Campaign one originally broadcast live on the Geek & Sundry Twitch and YouTube channels between March 12, 2015, and October 12, 2017, for a total of 115 episodes. Starting in November 2016, it was also broadcast live on the Alpha streaming service from Legendary Digital Networks. The show on Alpha had a unique overlay that included "real-time character sheets, damage and heal animations, and visualizations". Campaign one's closed captions were transcribed by a fan group who submitted them to Geek & Sundry. Geek & Sundry then added these to the YouTube copies of episodes. The VODs have since been uploaded to Critical Role's own YouTube channel.

The episodes of campaign one spilt by year:

Campaign two (2018–2021) 

The second campaign began on January 11, 2018, and follows the adventuring party known as The Mighty Nein. The story is set on the continent of Wildemount, which was briefly visited during the Vox Machina campaign. The Mighty Nein campaign is set about 20 years after Vox Machina's final battle against Vecna; it takes place at a time where tensions are very high between the Dwendalian Empire and the Kryn Dynasty, two of Wildemount's major powers. 

Prior to a hiatus due to the COVID-19 pandemic, the show had broadcast live, but has been pre-recorded since its return for episode 100 of Campaign Two. In May 2021, the cast announced that campaign two would end shortly, however, "the Mighty Nein's story wasn't finished". Collider reported that "Campaign 2 has spanned 100 hours of battle, 440 slain villains, and 530 total hours of dice-roll-driven adventuring. And that's not even counting the upcoming 7-hour finale". The finale aired on June 3, 2021; it was the longest episode at just over seven hours.

The episodes of campaign two split by year:

Campaign three (2021–current)

The third campaign premiered on October 21, 2021 with a simulcast live in Cinemark Theatres along with the regular Twitch and YouTube livestream. Critical Role will continue to be pre-recorded for the third campaign. Starting with the third campaign, the main campaign of Critical Role will not air new episodes on the last Thursday of every month; instead, other content by the studio will air in its time slot. 

The story is set immediately after Exandria Unlimited which took place 10 years after the events of the second campaign. Several cast members reprise their roles from Exandria Unlimited. The campaign is set on the continent of Marquet, which was briefly visited during the Vox Machina campaign. SyFy Wire highlighted that Marquet is "home to massive deserts, mountains, and even a volcano" and that it is "uncharted territory for the series".

The episodes of campaign three split by year:

Anthology series

Exandria Unlimited 

Exandria Unlimited (ExU) is an anthology series and is a spin-off of the main Critical Role series. The first season was originally broadcast from June 24 to August 12, 2021. That season is set in the city of Emon on the continent of Tal'Dorei 30 years after Campaign One and 10 years after Campaign Two. The players in this season are Ashley Johnson, Robbie Daymond, Liam O'Brien, Aimee Carrero, and Matthew Mercer. The season's game master is Aabria Iyengar (known for other streaming shows such as Happy Jacks RPG, Dimension 20, and Saving Throw). Anjali Bhimani guest stars in episodes four through six. In March 2022, a two-part adventure sequel, Exandria Unlimited: Kymal, was released. It followed Dorian Storm returning to his friends after his time in Campaign Three. Daymond, Mercer, Carrero, Bhimani and Iyengar reprised their roles; Erica Lindbeck also joined the cast.

IGN reported that "Exandria Unlimited will be considered canon within the wider Critical Role story, and 'will affect future environments and timelines across the overall lore of Critical Role.' So as fans await what may come from Campaign 3 of the core CR cast, Unlimited looks to offer a new vantage point into the world of Exandria". IGN also highlighted that "it's likely not the only such story planned; the announcement for the series teases that 'Within the world of Exandria, there are an unlimited amount of stories to be told - and we have only just begun'."

The second season, titled Exandria Unlimited: Calamity, was broadcast from May 26 to June 16, 2022. It follows a group of heroes from the Age of Arcanum – an age 1,500 years before the Critical Role series – who attempt to prevent the Calamity.

One-shots 
In addition to their main campaign series, Critical Role has also broadcast many one-shots – short adventures that take place within a single session of play.  four of these one-shots are listed on the show's official timeline. These cover canonical events within the storyline that impact the respective campaign, but are told outside the time frame of the main show. Other one-shots have only a tangential relationship to the campaigns. These are set in the world of Exandria or feature established canon characters but are not considered canonical themselves. Still other one-shots have no connection at all with the campaigns or the world of Exandria.

Canon 
The following one-shots are listed on the Critical Role website as part of the official timeline.

Shared world or characters
These one-shots are set within the world of Exandria or feature established characters from the main campaigns. They are not, however, deemed canonical—having no impact on the main storyline.

Promotional
These one-shots were made as promotions for other properties or groups.

Other
These one-shots are not set within Exandria, nor are they promotional.

Notes

References

External links 
 

2010s YouTube series
2015 web series debuts
2020s YouTube series

YouTube channels launched in 2018